Catterlen is a civil parish in the Eden District, Cumbria, England. It contains seven buildings that are recorded in the National Heritage List for England. Of these, one is listed at Grade I, the highest of the three grades, one is at Grade II*, the middle grade, and the others are at Grade II, the lowest grade.  The parish contains the village of Newton Reigny and is otherwise rural.  The listed buildings comprise a tower house and associated structures, a church, a house, farmhouses and farm buildings.


Key

Buildings

References

Citations

Sources

Lists of listed buildings in Cumbria